The earliest temples in Telangana include the Alampur Navabrahma Temples built during the 6th century CE by the Badami Chaulukyas.

The Kalyani Chaulukyas built several temples in modern-day Telangana including the Ramalingeswara Temple, Nandikandi.

Kakatiya architecture was developed during the reign of the Kakatiya dynasty between the 12th and 14th centuries. Prominent Kakatiya temples include the Ramappa and Thousand Pillar temples, as well as the Kota Gullu temple complex. The Karmanghat Hanuman Temple in Hyderabad is also dated to this period, however, the current temple structure is a later construction.

The Birla Mandir, Hyderabad was constructed between 1966 and 1976 as one of several temples built by the Birla family.

List of temples

 Yadadri Temple: Lord Vishnu (whose reincarnation is Lord Narasimha). The main deity is Lakshmi Narasimha Swamy. Located in Yadadri Bhuvanagiri District. In Ancient days Sri Yada Maharshi son of Sri Rushyashrunga Maharshi with the Blessings of Anjaneya Swamy had performed great penance for Lord Narasimha Swamy. After securing blessing for his penance Lord Narasimha had come into existence in Five Avatharas called as Sri Jwala Narasimha, Sri Yogananda Narasimha, Sri Ugra Narasimha, Sri Gandaberunda Narasimha, Sri Lakshmi Narasimha. As such this is known as "Pancha Narasimha Kshetram".
Raja Rajeswara Temple, Vemulawada : Notable for the Sri Raja Rajeswara Swamy Temple complex, a site of pilgrimage for both Hindu (particularly devotees of Vishnu and Shiva) and Muslim worshippers. Built by Chalukya Kings between AD 750 and 975, the complex is named for its presiding deity Sri Raja Rajeswara Swamy, an incarnation of Lord Shiva. It houses several temples dedicated to other deities including Sri Rama, Lakshmana, Lakshmi, Ganapathy, Lord Padmanabha Swamy and Lord Bhimeswara. The complex also contains a 400-year-old mosque. The temple is located in Karimnagar District.
 Basara: Gnana Saraswati Temple (Goddess of Knowledge) is located on the banks of the river Godavari in Nirmal District.
 Kaleswaram: Kaleswaram Temple  is located in Kaleswaram is a village in Mahadevpur Mandal in Karimnagar district in the Indian state of Telangana. 
 Dharmapuri: Dharmapuri attained religious importance owing to the existence of the shrine dedicated to Narasimha Swamy. Located in Karimnangar District.
 Kondagattu: Lord Hanuman Temple. According to the folklore, the temple was constructed by a cowherd some 300 years ago. Located in Karimnagar District.
 Alampur: Jogulamba Temple is located in the South-East corner of the village beside Tungabhadra river. Old temple of Jogulamba was destroyed by Bahamani sultans in the 14th century. The idols of Jogulamba and her two shaktis Chandi, Mundi were protected from them and placed in Bala brahmeswara swammy temple until 2005. The new temple constructed in the same place and the goddess was relocated. As per the local people Jogulamba is an Ugra rupa (highly energetic and hard to worship) and the water pool nearby it makes the atmosphere cool. The Yogamba (Jogulamba) temple is regarded as a Shakti Peetha where Sati Devi's upper teeth fell. The mythology of Daksha yaga and Sati's self-immolation is the story of origin of Shakti Peethas
 Suryapet-Peddagattu (పెద్దగట్టు జాతర) or Gollagattu Jathara (గొల్లగట్టు జాతర) is the festival done in the name of Lord Lingamanthulu Swamy and Goddess Choudamma every 2 years.The presiding deities, Sri Lingamanthula Swamy, believed an Incarnation of Lord Shiva, and his sister – Choudamma, are offered various pujas during the five-day fete.
 Hemachala Lakshmi Narsimha Swamy Temple  is the most ancient architectural divine ensemble which is located on the Mallur Ghat in the Mangapeta mandal of Warangal district. 
 Chilkur Balaji Temple is popularly known as Visa Balaji Temple is an ancient Hindu temple of Lord Balaji on the banks of Osman Sagar Lake near Hyderabad, India. It is 17 km from Mehedipatnam. It is one of the oldest temples in Hyderabad built during the time of Madanna and Akkanna, the uncles of Bhakta Ramadas.
 Komrelly Mallanna Temple: Komuravelli Mallikarjuna Swamy Temple (Lord Shiva) located in Komuravelly Village, Cheriyal Mandal, Warangal District.
Wargal Saraswati Temple: Sri Vidya Saraswati Temple located in Wargal, 47 km from Secunderabad (JBS), Medak District.
 Sri Stambhadri Lakshmi Narasimha Swamy temple is located in the heart of the City of Khammam. The city gets its name from the Stambhadri hill on which the temple is located.The ancient deity is located inside a cave on top of the hill.The temple is believed to be existing since Treta Yuga. 
 Garlavoddu Sri Lakshmi Narasimha Swamy Temple located in Enkuru village which is 45 km from Khammam City. This is one of the famous Temples in Khammam District.
 Surendrapuri Surendrapuri is a religious tourism destination located near Hyderabad, India in the Yadadri Bhuvanagiri district.

List of Prominent Temples
 Alampur Jogulamba Temple
 Gnana Saraswati Temple
 Raja Rajeswara Temple, Vemulawada
 Kondagattu 
 Chilkur Balaji Temple
 Yadagirigutta Temple
Karmanghat Hanuman Temple
 Lakshmi Narasimha Temple, Dharmapuri
 Kaleshwara Mukteswara Swamy Temple
 Ranganathaswamy Temple, Jiyaguda
 Chaya Someswara Temple
 Wargal Saraswati Temple
 Sri Peddamma Thalli Temple
 Keesaragutta Temple
 Surendrapuri

References

Lists of buildings and structures in Telangana
Lists of Hindu temples in India
Religion in Telangana